The Lion of St. Mark is an award given each year at the Cannes Lions International Festival of Creativity for a lifetime of services to creativity in communications.

It was instituted in 2011. The trophy is modelled on the lion statue in St Mark's Square, Venice, where the first Cannes Lions festival was held in 1954.

Winners
 2011, Sir John Hegarty
 2012, Dan Wieden
 2013, Lee Clow
 2014, Joe Pytka
 2015, Bob Greenberg
 2016, Marcello Serpa
 2017, David Droga
 2018, Piyush Pandey and Prasoon Pandey
 2019, Rich Silverstein & Jeff Goodby
 2020, Mary Wells Lawrence

References

Advertising awards
Awards established in 2011